Octocorallia (also known as Alcyonaria) is a class of Anthozoa comprising around 3,000 species of water-based organisms formed of colonial polyps with 8-fold symmetry. It includes the blue coral, soft corals, sea pens, and gorgonians (sea fans and sea whips) within three orders: Alcyonacea, Helioporacea, and Pennatulacea. These organisms have an internal skeleton secreted by mesoglea and polyps with eight tentacles and eight mesentaries. As with all Cnidarians these organisms have a complex life cycle including a motile phase when they are considered plankton and later characteristic sessile phase.

Octocorals have existed at least since the Ordovician period, as shown by Maurits Lindström's findings in the 1970s, however recent work has shown a possible Cambrian origin.

Biology

Octocorals resemble the stony corals in general appearance and in the size of their polyps, but lack the distinctive stony skeleton. Also unlike the stony corals, each polyp has only eight tentacles, each of which is feather-like in shape, with numerous side-branches, or pinnules.

Octocorals are colonial organisms, with numerous tiny polyps embedded in a soft matrix that forms the visible structure of the colony. The matrix is composed of mesogleal tissue, lined by a continuous epidermis and perforated by numerous tiny channels. The channels interconnect the gastrovascular cavities of the polyps, allowing water and nutrients to flow freely between all the members of the colony. The skeletal material, called coenenchyme, is composed of living tissue secreted by numerous wandering amoebocytes. Although it is generally soft, in many species it is reinforced with calcareous or horny material.

The polyp is largely embedded within the colonial skeleton, with only the uppermost surface, including the tentacles and mouth, projecting about the surface. The mouth is slit-like, with a single ciliated groove, or siphonoglyph, at one side to help control water flow. It opens into a tubular pharynx that projects down into a gastrovascular cavity that occupies the hollow interior. The pharynx is surrounded by eight radial partitions, or mesenteries, that divide the upper part of the gastrovascular cavity into chambers, one of which connects to the hollow space inside each tentacle. The gonads are located near the base of each mesentery.

Phylogeny
Octocorallia is considered to be monophyletic, meaning that all contained species are descended from a common ancestor, but the relationships between subdivisions are not well known. The sea pens (Pennatulacea) and blue coral (Helioporacea) continue to be assigned separate orders, whereas the current order Alcyonacea was historically represented by four orders: Alcyonacea, Gorgonacea, Stolonifera and Telestacea.

References

External links

 

 
Anthozoa
Animal classes